Carl E. Person (pronounced /ˈpir sən/) (born July 20, 1936) is an American attorney and politician. He founded the Paralegal Institute in the early 1970s and played a pivotal role in creating the paralegal field. He has also run unsuccessfully for various political offices. He was a candidate for the 2012 presidential nomination of the Libertarian Party, was the Reform Party nominee for Mayor of New York City in 2013, was the Libertarian nominee for New York State Attorney General in 2010 and was the Libertarian nominee for New York State Attorney General again in 2014.

Early life
Person was born in Manhattan and has lived in New York State most of his life with the exception of 2 years when his family lived in Nebraska and his 3 years of service in the U.S. Army.  Person dropped out of Northport High School after his sophomore year, and joined the U.S. Army for a 3-year enlistment.  His service included two years on Okinawa as a ship to shore high speed radio operator, to send and receive Morse code. Despite his lack of a high school diploma, Person is a graduate of Long Island University and Harvard Law School.

Legal career
From 1962 to 1968, Person worked as an associate attorney for three New York corporate law firms, including Mudge, Stern, Baldwin & Todd, which accepted Richard M. Nixon as a partner in 1962, shortly after Nixon lost his first bid for the presidency to John F. Kennedy.
In 1968, Person started his own law practice, and has been an individual practitioner ever since. Person's law practice from the start has focused on litigation in federal and state courts. His first case, an antitrust action, was brought against General Motors, Ford Motor Company, Chrysler Corporation and others, and lasted 18 years. Person's litigation experience includes civil rights, antitrust, mortgage foreclosure defense, securities fraud, copyright, trademark, age discrimination, price discrimination, employment termination, franchise termination, and other cases in which individuals and/or small businesses have claims against major corporations or government agencies.

In 1972 Person founded the Paralegal Institute and was instrumental in creating the paralegal field.

Person was an early proponent of advertising for lawyers. In the late 1970s, he received media attention for his advocacy of a private court system which would handle civil disputes.

Notable cases
In 1970, Person commenced his litigation practice by filing an antitrust action on behalf of a group of National Auto Brokers Corp. against General Motors, Ford and Chrysler and 60 other defendants.  To help him afford the cost of going up against the leading corporations in America, Person founded the Paralegal Institute in 1972.

Person spent more than 20 years in the practice of intellectual property law.  Thirty years after the 1962 doo-wop hit "Why Do Fools Fall in Love" was at the top of the charts, Person recaptured the song's copyright for members of the group The Teenagers in a landmark case. Person represented playwright Mark Dunn in a case against Paramount Pictures alleging that The Truman Show was essentially similar to Frank's Life, which appeared in a New York theatre several years before. In another case, Thee v. Parker Brothers, Inc., Eastern District of New York, Index No. 75–1554, commenced about 15 years after the game "Artifax" was first submitted to Parker Brothers by artist Christian Thee, Person obtained a jury verdict for Thee holding that he had been allegedly defrauded by Parker Brothers' publication of the game "Masterpiece".

When Ralph Anspach invented a game he called "Anti-Monopoly", Parker Brothers charged that it infringed on their copyright and trademark for their game Monopoly, and a lower court agreed.  All of Anspach's inventory of his game was dumped in a Minnesota landfill pursuant to court order. Person obtained a reversal in the Ninth Circuit Court of Appeals, and the U.S. Supreme Court upheld this victory when it denied certiorari.

Person has functioned as a private attorney general in several cases, enforcing civil rights and antitrust laws on behalf of individuals and small businesses.

Political campaigns

2010 New York State Attorney General election
Person was the Libertarian nominee for New York State Attorney General in 2010. He received 36,488 official votes and finished third out of four candidates on the ballot in that race.

2012 presidential election
Person was one of several candidates seeking the Libertarian Party's nomination for the 2012 presidential election.
 On the first ballot, which was won by former New Mexico Governor Gary Johnson, Person received 3 votes (0.5%)

2013 New York City mayoral election
Person was the Reform Party nominee for Mayor of New York City in the 2013 election. He came twelfth out of fifteen candidates with 306 votes.

2014 New York State Attorney General election
He was the Libertarian nominee for New York State Attorney General in the 2014 election.

References

External links
 Carl Person, official site
 Carl Person (Reform), candidate profile
 

1936 births
Living people
Candidates in the 2010 United States elections
Harvard Law School alumni
Long Island University alumni
New York (state) lawyers
New York (state) Libertarians
People from Suffolk County, New York
Reform Party of the United States of America politicians
United States Army soldiers
Candidates in the 2012 United States presidential election
21st-century American politicians